Hansen is a city in Twin Falls County, Idaho, United States. The population was 1,144 at the 2010 census. It is part of the Twin Falls, Idaho Micropolitan Statistical Area.

Geography
Hansen is located at  (42.531246, -114.301550).

Demographics

2010 census
As of the census of 2010, there were 1,144 people, 395 households, and 293 families residing in the city. The racial makeup of the city was 85.0% White, 0.3% African American, 1.2% Native American, 0.2% Asian, 9.8% from other races, and 3.5% from two or more races. Hispanic or Latino of any race were 16.5% of the population.

There were 395 households, of which 42.8% had children under the age of 18 living with them, 55.9% were married couples living together, 11.1% had a female householder with no husband present, 7.1% had a male householder with no wife present, and 25.8% were non-families. 22.0% of all households were made up of individuals, and 10.6% had someone living alone who was 65 years of age or older. The average household size was 2.90 and the average family size was 3.40.

The median age in the city was 32 years. 33.8% of residents were under the age of 18; 6.6% were between the ages of 18 and 24; 26.1% were from 25 to 44; 21.9% were from 45 to 64; and 11.6% were 65 years of age or older. The gender makeup of the city was 49.7% male and 50.3% female.

2000 census
As of the census of 2000, there were 970 people, 349 households, and 255 families residing in the city. The racial makeup of the city was 95.77% White, 0.31% African American, 0.82% Native American, 0.31% Asian, 0.10% Pacific Islander, 0.62% from other races, and 2.06% from two or more races. Hispanic or Latino of any race were 5.26% of the population.

There were 349 households, out of which 39.3% had children under the age of 18 living with them, 56.4% were married couples living together, 11.5% had a female householder with no husband present, and 26.9% were non-families. 21.2% of all households were made up of individuals, and 9.5% had someone living alone who was 65 years of age or older.  The average household size was 2.78 and the average family size was 3.23.

In the city, the population was spread out, with 31.8% under the age of 18, 9.2% from 18 to 24, 27.2% from 25 to 44, 21.1% from 45 to 64, and 10.7% who were 65 years of age or older.  The median age was 32 years. For every 100 females, there were 98.0 males.  For every 100 females age 18 and over, there were 95.3 males.

The median income for a household in the city was $29,125, and the median income for a family was $32,750. Males had a median income of $26,607 versus $18,750 for females. The per capita income for the city was $12,339.  About 11.7% of families and 15.8% of the population were below the poverty line, including 17.8% of those under age 18 and 20.4% of those age 65 or over.

See also

 List of cities in Idaho

References

External links

 

Cities in Idaho
Cities in Twin Falls County, Idaho
Twin Falls, Idaho metropolitan area